After Tomorrow is a 1932 American pre-Code drama film directed by Frank Borzage and starring Charles Farrell, Marian Nixon, Minna Gombell, Josephine Hull and William Collier, Sr.

Plot
Peter Piper (Charles Farrell) and his girlfriend Sidney Taylor (Marian Nixon) have been engaged for a long time (three years), but the economic situation of the Great Depression and the selfish demands of their respective mothers have delayed their marriage. They imagine their future together "after tomorrow" in the lyrics of their favorite song.

While clinging Mrs. Piper (Josephine Hull), a widow completely fixated on her boy, cannot bear the thought that her son will one day leave her, does her best to break up Sidney and Peter's relationship. Sidney's mother, Else Taylor (Minna Gombell) thinks only of her own needs, and her lover, Malcolm Jarvis (William Pawley), a lodger in their house, with whom she leaves for good the day before Pete and Sidney's wedding, causing a second heart attack to Willie, Sidney's father (William Collier Sr.). The wedding has to be postponed for another half of a year. When finally Else comes back to help her daughter and Pete financially, but Willie does not allow it.

Pete finds the courage to face his mother's boyfriend, Mr. Beardsley (Ferdinand Munier), owner of a chewing gum factory, giving him the same as his mother gives to Sidney, and while arguing if he has serious intentions with his mother, Mr. Beardsley tells him that the hundred dollars he invested in his factory had a revenue of $740 at that point. So finally they can marry and go to Niagara Falls.

Cast
 Charles Farrell as Peter Piper
 Marian Nixon as Sidney Taylor
 Minna Gombell as Else Taylor
 William Collier, Sr. as Willie Taylor
 Josephine Hull as Mrs. Piper
 William Pawley as Malcolm Jarvis
 Greta Granstedt as Betty
 Ferdinand Munier as Mr. Beardsley
 Nora Lane as Florence Blandy

References

External links

1932 films
1932 drama films
American black-and-white films
American drama films
American films based on plays
Films directed by Frank Borzage
Fox Film films
Films with screenplays by Sonya Levien
1930s English-language films
1930s American films